Gürbey İleri (born 13 February 1988) is a Turkish actor known for his role as "Sancar Bey" in Diriliş: Ertuğrul and "Shehzade Mehmed" in Magnificent Century.

Biography
İleri is a graduate of Beykent University with a degree in acting. He started his career in 2007 with a supporting role in the teen drama Arka Sıradakiler. He made his cinematic debut in 2008 with Ayakta Kal, in which he portrayed the character of Berkin. After briefly appearing in the series Kalbim Seni Seçti, his breakthrough came with his role in the historical drama Muhteşem Yüzyıl as Şehzade Mehmed. Between 2014–2015, he was a regular on the series Kaderimin Yazıldığı Gün alongside Özcan Deniz and Hatice Şendil. In 2015, he appeared as Asım on TRT 1 series Sevda Kuşun Kanadında. Between 2017–2018, he had a recurring role in the historical drama Diriliş: Ertuğrul.

Filmography

Television 
 Arka Sıradakiler, 2007–2011 (Kerem)
 Kalbim Seni Seçti, 2011 (Kaan)
 Muhteşem Yüzyıl, 2012–2013 (Şehzade Mehmed)
 Yasak, 2014
 Kaderimin Yazıldığı Gün, 2014–2015 (Kerem)
 Eve Dönüş, 2015–2016 (Aras)
 Sevda Kuşun Kanadında, 2015–2016 (Asım)
 Diriliş: Ertuğrul, 2017–2018 (Sancar Bey)

Film 
 Ayakta Kal, 2008 (Berkin)
 Özgür Dünya, 2019 (Fatih)
 Ali, 2019 (Ali)

References

External links 
 
 

1988 births
Male actors from Istanbul
Living people
Turkish male television actors
Turkish male film actors
Beykent University alumni